Safonovo is an urban locality (an urban-type settlement) under the administrative jurisdiction of the closed-administrative territorial formation of Severomorsk in Murmansk Oblast, Russia, located on the Kola Peninsula on the Kola Bay,  west of Severomorsk proper. Population:

History
It was founded as a work settlement around 1936.

References

Notes

Sources
Official website of Murmansk Oblast. Registry of the Administrative-Territorial Structure of Murmansk Oblast 

Urban-type settlements in Murmansk Oblast
